Brant Clifford Weidner (born October 28, 1960) is an American former professional basketball player from the National Basketball Association. He played one season in the league, appearing in just eight regular-season games.

Weidner played basketball at Parkland High School in South Whitehall Township, Pennsylvania and then William & Mary in Williamsburg, Virginia.  He was selected by the San Antonio Spurs with the 20th pick of the 4th round (90th overall) in the 1983 NBA Draft.

External links
Brant Weidner at basketball-reference.com

1960 births
Living people
American expatriate basketball people in the Netherlands
American men's basketball players
Basketball players from Pennsylvania
DePaul University alumni 
Heroes Den Bosch players
Parkland High School (Pennsylvania) alumni
Power forwards (basketball)
San Antonio Spurs draft picks
San Antonio Spurs players
Sportspeople from Lehigh County, Pennsylvania
William & Mary Tribe men's basketball players